Charles Thomas Pierce (3 February 1917 – 30 August 2007) was an Australian rules footballer who played with Hawthorn and North Melbourne in the Victorian Football League (VFL).

Notes

External links 

1917 births
2007 deaths
Australian rules footballers from Melbourne
Hawthorn Football Club players
North Melbourne Football Club players
People from Hawthorn, Victoria